Tumi and the Volume, released in December 2005, is the second album from Tumi and the Volume. It is their first studio album.

Track listing
"Ellof  – 17:45"
"Floor"
"Bus Stop Confessions"
"Johnny Dyani"
"What It's All About"
"Smile, you on camera" (featuring Ft. Fifi)
"Afrique" (prod. by moO, featured in FIFA 08)
"The Story Behind the Pain"
"Signs"
"Oslo"
"Basement"
"Ladies and Gentlemen"
"Learning"
"In a Minute" (featuring Ft. Fifi)
"Bergman's Theory"
"Sticks and Stones"
"These Women"

Credits 
Producer(s): Tumi and the Volume

References

2005 albums
Tumi and the Volume albums